Chan Hok-Fung is a Pro-Beijing DAB Hong Kong politician who was a member of Central and Western District Council, and was once the vice-chairman of the council, until losing re-election in the 2019 Hong Kong local elections.

Election campaign experience
Since 2007, Chan has been running, and elected in Hong Kong local elections, until being defeated in 2019. Chan has also been participating the party primaries of 2020 Hong Kong Legislative Election, seeking to run the election on behalf of DAB in Hong Kong Island constituency.

Controversies

Defamation of Democratic district councilor Cheng Lai-King 

Democratic district councilor Cheng Lai-king was arrested on 26 March 2020 for forwarding information of the police officers who was accused of shooting the eye of an Indonesian female journalist during the 2019 September global anti-totalitarian march in Hong Kong. Some members of the Democratic Party, including lawmaker Ted Hui, went to bail, but because the police temporarily requested an increase in bail, they resorted to count the bail immediately outside the police station. However, Chan uploaded a photo on social media accusing Hui for paying the protesters. The accusation of Chan was disproved by Sam Yip, a pro-democracy Central and Western District Council member. The Democratic Party responded by challenging that the photo was taken by the police in the police station, and suspected if the police had facilitated the distribution of rumours.

References

External links 
 http://facebook.com/chanhokfung

Living people
1976 births
Democratic Alliance for the Betterment and Progress of Hong Kong politicians
District councillors of Central and Western District
HK LegCo Members 2022–2025
Members of the Election Committee of Hong Kong, 2017–2021
Members of the Election Committee of Hong Kong, 2021–2026
Hong Kong pro-Beijing politicians